On the evening of 11 December 2018, a terrorist attack occurred in Strasbourg, France, when a man attacked civilians in the city's busy  (Christmas market) with a revolver and a knife, killing five and wounding 11 before fleeing in a taxi. Authorities called the shooting an act of terrorism.

The attacker was 29-year-old , who had multiple criminal convictions and was on a security services watchlist as a suspected Islamist extremist. Chekatt was killed in a shootout with French police on the evening of 13 December after a manhunt involving 700 officers. He had pledged allegiance to the terrorist organisation Islamic State of Iraq and the Levant (ISIL) judicial sources said.

Background
 is the Alsatian dialect name of the Christmas market in Strasbourg, held annually on the square in front of the Strasbourg Cathedral since 1570. Since then, the market has been under reinforced security. In 2016, several people were arrested in Marseille and Strasbourg for planning a terrorist attack; officials considered cancelling the Christmas market, but it was ultimately held as scheduled.

He was not at home, but they found a stun grenade, a loaded .22 calibre rifle, four knives, and ammunition.

Attack 

The attack lasted ten minutes and took place in multiple streets, during which time  was heard shouting "" as he attacked members of the crowd. A 45-year-old Thai tourist was hit in the head in front of a restaurant and died, despite a passersby attempting to resuscitate him; ambulances took over 45 minutes to arrive.

His testimony allowed the police to identify the gunman, as the man bragged about killing people and having a grenade at home. Two days after the attack, Chekatt's gun was revealed to be a Modèle 1892 revolver.

Initially, 350 men of the security forces hunted for Chekatt, supported by air units. Five hundred more men joined the next day, with a further 1,300 planned to join as reinforcements. The incident led to the closure of locations around the city, including the European Parliament building. Police used Twitter to relay information to the public. The French government raised their security threat level to the highest possible as the search continued, though Justice Minister Nicole Belloubet stated on  that a state of emergency would not be declared for the incident. Five thousand people were stranded in a sports facility used as temporary shelter, and the European Parliament was put on lockdown. President Antonio Tajani tweeted that the European Parliament "will not be intimidated by terrorist or criminal attacks" and will "continue to work and react, strengthened by freedom and democracy against terrorist violence". The incident was declared an act of terrorism by French authorities.

Victims 
Five people were killed; two died at the scene and three others in hospital, while 11 others were injured, four critically. The first of the dead to be identified was a 45-year-old male tourist from Thailand who was shot multiple times and died at the scene. He was on holiday with his wife, who was also shot, but survived. The others were a French 61-year-old former bank employee; a 45-year-old local male mechanic and Muslim originally from Afghanistan who died two days later, Antonio Megalizzi, a 29-year-old journalist from Italy covering the European Parliament plenary session, who died on 14 December; and Barto Pedro Orent-Niedzielski, a 36-year-old French-Polish national who died on 16 December.

Attacker 

According to French authorities, Chekatt had been known to police since the age of 10 and he had his first criminal conviction by age 13. He was known to security services for a total of 27 convictions in France, Germany, and Switzerland, arising from 67 recorded crimes in France alone. His criminal activities started with petty crime, robbery and drug dealing.

French police considered him a "gangster-jihadist", a term referring to people convicted of various crimes and "radicalised" in prison. Chekatt was released from prison in France in 2015, then received a prison sentence for theft in Singen, Germany and was expelled to France after his release in 2017.

He was listed for his recent "religious radicalisation" and for "Islamic extremism". Neighbours said that he seemed quite ordinary, comparing him to his more traditional brother. His German lawyer told media that "he was just an ordinary criminal. It was no special case. We didn't notice any radicalisation." Secretary of State Laurent Nuñez stated that Chekatt had become a "terrorism apologist" in prison, but had not been expected to perform an attack. On the morning of the attack, local police had attempted to arrest him in relation to an attempted murder, but they could not locate him, because Chekatt's father had warned him by SMS that the gendarmes were about to arrest him.

Investigators subsequently concluded that Chekatt had made extensive preparations for the attack. He told fellow inmates in 2015 that he would "commit a robbery before departing for Syria or die a martyr", and became "very interested in seeking weapons, according to a friend of the jihadist, Audrey Mondjehi."

Manhunt and Chekatt's death 

An investigation was initiated for "murder and acts of terrorism in relation to a criminal enterprise". A search warrant was issued in Algeria for a "very radicalised" third brother, who has his own  record because of radicalisation and "contacts with Islamist circles in Strasbourg".

 was still at large after the attack, and an international manhunt began. There were some initial fears that he had escaped to Germany across the Rhine. Ultimately, more than 700 officers were involved in the manhunt.

He fired on officers when they tried to question him and they returned fire, killing him.

Soon after his death, the Islamic State claimed him as one of their "soldiers" through their propaganda outlet, Amaq. Christophe Castaner, France's interior minister, dismissed the claim as "completely opportunistic". In an interview for France 2 Chekatt's father said his son had been an Islamic State supporter. Nine days after Chekatt's death, a USB key containing a video of him pledging allegiance to the Islamic State was found among his belongings judicial sources said.

Reactions 

Laurent Wauquiez, leader of the conservative party , called for a strengthening of the laws.

Border controls were increased due to Strasbourg's proximity to Germany. The Christmas market was closed on the day after the attack.

Conspiracy theories
Conspiracy theorists and some members of the yellow vests movement, which was ongoing at the time of the attack, commented on social media that the shooting was a false flag conspiracy by the French president, to distract attention from the movement's protests. This prompted angry denials from cabinet ministers, who called the claims "disgusting".

See also 

 2016 Berlin truck attack
 2016 Nice truck attack
 November 2015 Paris attacks
 Campinas Cathedral shooting, an unrelated attack which happened on the same day

Notes

References 

2018 mass shootings in Europe
2018 murders in France
21st century in Strasbourg
Crime in Grand Est
Deaths by firearm in France
December 2018 crimes in Europe
December 2018 events in France
ISIL terrorist incidents in France
Islamic terrorist incidents in 2018
Islamist attack plots and attacks on Christmas markets
Knife attacks
Mass murder in 2018
Mass shootings in France
Stabbing attacks in 2018
Stabbing attacks in France
Terrorist incidents in France in 2018
21st-century mass murder in France